The Staatsmijn Emma was a Dutch coal mine located in  (now part of Brunssum) and Hoensbroek (now part of Heerlen). The mine was in operation from 1911 till 1973.

External links

 Coal Mining in the Netherlands (Delft University of Technology)

Coal mines in the Netherlands
Buildings and structures in Limburg (Netherlands)
Buildings and structures in Heerlen
Brunssum